King Herod Agrippa may refer to:

 Herod Agrippa I, who killed James the son of Zebedee and imprisoned Peter
 Herod Agrippa II, who listened to Paul's defense

See also
 Agrippa (disambiguation)
 King Agrippa (disambiguation)